Timothy Kevin Boyle (born October 3, 1994) is an American football quarterback who is currently a free agent. He played college football at Connecticut and Eastern Kentucky where he went undrafted in the 2018 draft. He played for the Green Bay Packers and the Detroit Lions.

High school career
Boyle grew up in Middlefield, Connecticut, and attended Xavier High School in Middletown, Connecticut, where he won three championships under head coach Sean Marinan.

College career
While playing for the Connecticut Huskies, Boyle started 10 games and then transferred to Eastern Kentucky, where he started all 11 games as a redshirt senior and finished first in passing yards in the Ohio Valley Conference.

College statistics

Professional career

Green Bay Packers
Boyle signed with the Green Bay Packers as an undrafted free agent on May 4, 2018. After an impressive preseason, Boyle made the 53-man roster in September 2018, as the team's third string quarterback behind Aaron Rodgers and DeShone Kizer.

Boyle did not play during the 2018 regular season. He saw his first professional playing time in a regular season on October 20, 2019, during a Week 7 win over the Oakland Raiders. Boyle took over for Rodgers during the final minutes of the game after victory was assured, kneeling the ball three times for −3 yards to run out the clock. He saw more extended playing time five weeks later on November 24 during a lopsided loss to the San Francisco 49ers, completing his first NFL pass to backup tight end Robert Tonyan, and finished the game 3-of-4 for 15 yards.

Boyle was scheduled to become a restricted free agent following the 2020 season, but the team did not extend a tender to him at the start of the new league year, so he became an unrestricted free agent on March 17, 2021.

Detroit Lions
On March 22, 2021, Boyle signed a one-year contract with the Detroit Lions. He was placed on injured reserve on September 2, and activated on November 20, making his first career start in Week 11 in place of an injured Jared Goff. He completed 15 of 23 pass attempts for 77 yards, but also threw two interceptions in a 13-10 loss to the Cleveland Browns. He made his second career start in a Week 16 game against the Atlanta Falcons with Goff sidelined due to COVID-19, completing 24 of 34 pass attempts for 219 yards and a touchdown, but also threw a loss-sealing interception with less than a minute to play on goal-to-go, losing 20-16.

On March 14, 2022, Boyle signed a one-year contract extension with the Lions. He was released on August 30, 2022, and re-signed to the practice squad.

Chicago Bears
On November 30, 2022, Boyle was signed by the Chicago Bears off the Lions practice squad.

NFL career statistics

Regular season

References

External links

 Tim Boyle – ESPN Profile

1994 births
Living people
Players of American football from Hartford, Connecticut
American football quarterbacks
Eastern Kentucky Colonels football players
UConn Huskies football players
Green Bay Packers players
Detroit Lions players
People from Middlefield, Connecticut
Chicago Bears players